Cú Coirne Ua Madudhan (died 1158) was King of Síol Anmchadha.

No details seem to be known of his era.

References

 O'Madáin: History of the O'Maddens of Hy-Many, Gerard Madden, 2004. .

People from County Galway
12th-century Irish monarchs
1158 deaths
Year of birth unknown